Edward Hobson (14 July 1869 – 22 August 1923) was an English cricketer. He played in two first-class matches for the Jamaican cricket team in 1905/06.

See also
 List of Jamaican representative cricketers

References

External links
 

1869 births
1923 deaths
English cricketers
Jamaica cricketers
Sportspeople from New York (state)